The 2008 European Amateur Team Championship took place 1–5 July at Royal Park Golf & Country Club in Fiano, Italy. It was the 26th men's golf European Amateur Team Championship.

It was the first time the championship was played in consecutive years, since its inauguration in 1959.

Venue 
The club was founded in 1971 by the Agnelli family. Its first course, the Allianz Course, a parkland and forest course, in Fiano, in the Metropolitan City of Turin, about 20 kilometres (12 miles) northwest of Turin, in the region Piedmont, Italy, was designed the same year by Robert Trent Jones Sr.

Format 
Each team consisted of 6 players, playing two rounds of stroke-play over two days, counting the five best scores each day for each team.

The eight best teams formed flight A, in knock-out match-play over the next three days. The teams were seeded based on their positions after the stroke play. The first placed team were drawn to play the quarter final against the eight placed team, the second against the seventh, the third against the sixth and the fourth against the fifth. Teams were allowed to use six players during the team matches, selecting four of them in the two morning foursome games and five players in to the afternoon single games. Teams knocked out after the quarter finals played one foursome game and four single games in each of their remaining  matches. Games all square at the 18th hole were declared halved, if the team match was already decided.

The eight teams placed 9–16 in the qualification stroke-play formed flight B, to play similar knock-out play, with one foursome game and four single games in each match, to decide their final positions.

The four teams placed 17–20 formed flight C, to play each other in a round-robin system, with one foursome game and four single games in each match, to decide their final positions.

Teams 
20 nation teams contested the event, the same number of teams as at the previous event one year earlier. Poland took part for the first time. Each team consisted of six players.

Players in the leading teams

Other participating teams

Winners 
Five-time-winners team Scotland won the opening 36-hole competition, with a 22-under-par score of 698. Tied five strokes behind were team Sweden and team Germany. Sweden earned 2nd place on the tie breaking better non-counting scores. Host nation Italy, with 15-year-old future European Tour winner Matteo Manassero in the team, finished 5th.

There was no official award for the lowest individual score, but individual leader were Wallace Booth, Scotland, with a 10-under-par score of 134, two strokes ahead of Jorge Campillo, Spain, and Callum Macaulay, Scotland.

Defending champions team Ireland, led by team captain Michael Burns, won the gold medal, earning their sixth title, beating team England in the final 4–2. The winning Irish team, combined from the Republic of Ireland and Northern Ireland, included future professional major winner 21-year-old Shane Lowry.

Team Germany, earned the bronze on third place, after beating France 4–3 in the bronze match.

Results 
Qualification round

Team standings

* Note: In the event of a tie the order was determined by the best total of the two non-counting scores of the two rounds.

Individual leaders

 Note: There was no official award for the lowest individual score.

Flight A

Bracket

Final games

* Note: Game declared halved, since team match already decided.

Flight B

Bracket

Flight C

First round

Second round

Third round

Final standings

Sources:

See also 
 European Golf Association – Organizer of European amateur golf championships
 Eisenhower Trophy – biennial world amateur team golf championship for men organized by the International Golf Federation.
 European Ladies' Team Championship – European amateur team golf championship for women organised by the European Golf Association.

References

External links 
 European Golf Association: Full results

European Amateur Team Championship
Golf tournaments in Italy
European Amateur Team Championship
European Amateur Team Championship
European Amateur Team Championship